Vernon County is located in the western region of the U.S. state of Missouri, on the border with Kansas. As of the 2010 census, the population was 21,159. Its county seat is Nevada. The county was organized on February 27, 1855, considerably later than counties in the eastern part of the state. It was named for Colonel Miles Vernon (1786–1867), a state senator and veteran of the Battle of New Orleans. This was part of the large historic territory of the Osage Nation of Native Americans.

History
The county was developed for agriculture and is still mostly rural.

Vernon County suffered considerable damage during the American Civil War. Guerrillas and insurgents had waged raids against Union troops and carried out personal vendettas in the county. On May 23, 1863, Union Army soldiers burned the county seat of Nevada, along with the courthouse, in retaliation.  The present courthouse was completed in 1907.

Vernon County was one of four Missouri counties that were wholly depopulated by Union General Thomas Ewing's General Order No. 11 (1863), which ordered the people evacuated to end support for Confederate guerrillas operating in the area. Most of the residents would not be allowed to return to their homes until after the Civil War ended in May 1865.

Geography

Adjacent counties
Bates County (north)
St. Clair County (northeast)
Cedar County (east)
Barton County (south)
Crawford County, Kansas (southwest)
Bourbon County, Kansas (west)
Linn County, Kansas (northwest)

Major highways
 Interstate 49
 U.S. Route 54
 U.S. Route 71
 Route 43

Demographics

As of the census of 2000, there were 20,454 people, 7,966 households, and 5,432 families residing in the county.  The population density was 24 people per square mile (9/km2).  There were 8,872 housing units at an average density of 11 per square mile (4/km2).  The racial makeup of the county was 96.99% White, 0.61% Black or African American, 0.79% Native American, 0.31% Asian, 0.03% Pacific Islander, 0.31% from other races, and 0.95% from two or more races. Approximately 0.84% of the population were Hispanic or Latino of any race.

There were 7,966 households, out of which 32.20% had children under the age of 18 living with them, 55.30% were married couples living together, 9.60% had a female householder with no husband present, and 31.80% were non-families. 28.10% of all households were made up of individuals, and 13.00% had someone living alone who was 65 years of age or older.  The average household size was 2.44, and the average family size was 2.97.

In the county, the population was spread out, with 26.60% under 18, 9.20% from 18 to 24, 25.40% from 25 to 44, 22.50% from 45 to 64, and 16.30% who were 65 years of age or older.  The median age was 37 years. For every 100 females, there were 93.50 males.  For every 100 females age 18 and over, there were 88.00 males.

The median income for a household in the county was $30,021, and the median income for a family was $37,714. Males had a median income of $28,182 versus $19,026 for females. The per capita income for the county was $15,047.  About 10.10% of families and 14.90% of the population were below the poverty line, including 20.30% of those under age 18 and 13.30% of those age 65 or over.

2020 Census

Education

Public schools
Bronaugh R-VII School District – Bronaugh
Bronaugh Elementary School (PK-06)
Bronaugh High School (07-12)
Nevada R-V School District – Nevada
Bryan Elementary School (PK-01)
Benton Elementary School (02)
Truman Elementary School (03-05)
Nevada Middle School (06-08)
Nevada High School (09-12)
/ Northeast Vernon County R-I School District – Walker
Northeast Vernon County Elementary School (PK-06)
Northeast Vernon County High School (07-12)
Sheldon R-VIII School District – Sheldon
Sheldon Elementary School (PK-06)
Sheldon High School (07-12)

Private schools
Nevada Seventh-day Adventist Christian School – Nevada (02-07) – Seventh-day Adventist
St. Mary Elementary School – Nevada (Early Childhood) – Roman Catholic

Colleges and universities
Cottey College – Nevada A private, four-year college for women.

Public libraries
Nevada Public Library

Politics

Local
The Republican Party predominantly controls politics at the local level in Vernon County despite the Democratic Party's historical control. Republicans hold all but three of the elected positions in the county.

State

All of Vernon County is a part of Missouri's 126th District in the Missouri House of Representatives and is represented by Patricia Pike (R-Adrian).

 

All of Vernon County is a part of Missouri's 31st District in the Missouri Senate and is currently represented by Rick Brattin (R-Harrisonville).

Federal

All of Vernon County is included in Missouri's 4th Congressional District and is currently represented by Vicky Hartzler (R-Harrisonville) in the U.S. House of Representatives.

Political culture
Like many neighboring counties, Vernon County has become increasingly Republican over the past few presidential elections. The last time a Democratic candidate has carried this county was in 1996 by Bill Clinton.

Missouri presidential preference primary (2008)

Former U.S. Senator Hillary Clinton (D-New York) received more votes, a total of 1,434, than any candidate from either party in Vernon County during the 2008 presidential primary.

Communities

Townships

Bacon Township
Badger Township
Blue Mound Township
Center Township
Clear Creek Township
Coal Township
Deerfield Township
Dover Township
Drywood Township
Harrison Township
Henry Township
Lake Township
Metz Township
Montevallo Township
Moundville Township
Osage Township
Richland Township
Virgil Township
Walker Township
Washington Township

Cities

Bronaugh
Nevada (county seat)
Schell City
Sheldon

Villages

Deerfield
Harwood
Metz
Milo
Moundville
Richards
Stotesbury

Unincorporated communities

 Amos
 Arthur
 Bellamy
 Blaine
 Bristow
 Carbon Center
 Dederick
 Ellis
 Eve
 Fair Haven
 Horton
 Katy
 Ketterman
 Montevallo
 Panama
 Portia
 Swart
 Rinehart
 Virgil City
 Walker
 Zodiac

Former settlements
 Fort Carondelet

See also
National Register of Historic Places listings in Vernon County, Missouri

References

External links
 Digitized 1930 Plat Book of Vernon County  from University of Missouri Division of Special Collections, Archives, and Rare Books

 
1855 establishments in Missouri
Populated places established in 1855